Polydectes (reigned from c. 835 to c. 805 BC) was king of Sparta and a member of the Eurypontid dynasty. He was succeeded by king Eunomus.

References 

9th-century BC Greek people
9th-century BC rulers
Eurypontid kings of Sparta